Naregal may refer to places in India:

Naregal, Gadag, a village in Gadag district in the state of Karnataka
Naregal, Haveri, a village in Haveri district in the state of Karnataka